Chris Armand Dirks  (born 23 May 1967) is a South African former rugby union player.

Playing career
A product of the Secunda High School in Mpumalanga and the Rand Afrikaans University in Johannesburg, Dirks represented  in the South African provincial rugby competitions. At the end of the 1993 season, he toured with the Springboks to Argentina. Dirks did not play in any test matches but played in two tour matches, scoring two tries for the Springboks.

See also
List of South Africa national rugby union players – Springbok no. 597
List of South Africa national rugby sevens players

References

1967 births
Living people
South African rugby union players
South Africa international rugby union players
Golden Lions players
South Africa international rugby sevens players
Rugby union players from the Free State (province)
Rugby union wings
Rugby union fullbacks